DZDP-TV (channel 28) is a television station in Naga, Camarines Sur, Philippines, airing programming from the GTV network. It is owned and operated by GMA Network, Inc. alongside GMA outlet DWAI-TV (channel 7). Both stations share studios and transmitters at the GMA Broadcast Complex, Concepcion Pequeña, Naga City.

Digital television

Digital channels

DZDP-TV's feed is broadcast on DWAI-TV digital subchannel operates on UHF channel 38 (617.143 MHz) and broadcasts on the following subchannels:

See also
GTV
DWAI-TV
Barangay FM 101.5 Naga
List of GTV stations

Television stations in Naga, Camarines Sur
GTV (Philippine TV network) stations
Television channels and stations established in 1992